Sacks & Co. is a public relations, marketing, management and consulting firm with offices in New York, Nashville and Los Angeles.

Public relations
Founded in 1994, Sacks & Co. manages the public image of major and debuting artists—musicians, authors, comedians, actors and filmmakers, among others—as well as record labels, television and film producers, theater companies, and arts presenters.

Sacks & Co.’s roster of current and past musicians spans all genres including pop, rock, dance, jazz, classical, world, country, Latin and beyond. Sacks & Co.’s films have premiered at the Sundance, Berlin, SXSW, Slamdance and Tribeca film festivals, among others. The firm has represented arts presenters in New York and across the country as well as music, comedy and arts festivals nationwide.

External links 
 

Companies based in New York City
Consulting firms established in 1990
1990 establishments in New York City